In mathematics, the Lehmer–Schur algorithm (named after Derrick Henry Lehmer and Issai Schur) is a root-finding algorithm for complex polynomials, extending the idea of enclosing roots like in the one-dimensional bisection method to the complex plane. It uses the Schur-Cohn test to test increasingly smaller disks for the presence or absence of roots.

Schur-Cohn algorithm
This algorithm allows one to find the distribution of the roots of a complex polynomial with respect to the unit circle in the complex plane. It is based on two auxiliary polynomials, introduced by Schur.

where a bar denotes complex conjugation.

,
with leading zero-terms, if any, removed.

Lemma
 If , then , and  share roots on the unit circle, including their multiplicities.
 If , then  and  have the same number of roots inside the  unit circle.
 If , then  and  have the same number of roots inside the  unit circle.

Proof
Also  implies . From this and the definitions above the first two statements follow.

For a more accessible representation of the lemma,
Then the lemma implies that
 if  and
 if 

Application of the foregoing to each pair of consecutive members of this sequence gives the following result.

Theorem[Schur-Cohn test]
 All roots of  lie inside the unit circle if and only if
 All roots of  lie outside the unit circle if and only if 
.

Lehmer's method

Lehmers method is as follows.

Next this disk can be covered with a set of overlapping smaller disks, one of them placed concentrically and the remaining ones evenly spread over the annulus yet to be covered. From this set, using the test again,  disks containing no root of  can be removed.

The merits of the method are that it consists of repetition of a single procedure and that all roots are found simultaneously, whether they are real or complex, single, multiple or clustered. Also deflation, i.e. removal of roots already found, is not needed and every test starts with the full-precision, original polynomial. And, remarkably, this polynomial has never to be evaluated.

However, the smaller the disks become, the more the coefficients of the corresponding 'scaled' polynomials will differ in relative magnitude. This may cause overflow or underflow of computer computations, thus limiting the radii of the disks from below and thereby the precision of the computed roots.

.
To avoid extreme scaling, or just for the sake of efficiency, one may start with testing a number of concentric disks for the number of included roots and thus reduce the region  where roots occur to a number of narrow , concentric annuli. Repeating this procedure with another centre and combining the results, the said region becomes the union of intersections of such annuli.

Finally, when a small disk is found that contains a single root, that root may be further approximated using other methods, e.g. Newton's method.

References

Root-finding algorithms